The 2017–18 Eastern Counties Football League season (known as the 2017–18 Thurlow Nunn Eastern Counties Football League for sponsorship reasons) was the 75th in the history of Eastern Counties Football League, a football competition in England. It was also the last season to have a single division at Step 6.

The constitution for Step 5 and Step 6 divisions for 2017–18 was announced on 26 May 2017, and the Eastern Counties divisions constitutions were ratified at the league's AGM on 17 June 2017.

Premier Division

The Premier Division featured 19 clubs which competed in the division last season, along with five new clubs:
 Coggeshall Town, promoted from Division One
 Haverhill Borough, promoted from Division One
 Histon, relegated from the Southern Football League
 Stowmarket Town, promoted from Division One
 Wroxham, relegated from the Isthmian League

League table

Stadia and locations

Division One

Division One featured 17 clubs which competed in the division last season, along with four new clubs:
Little Oakley, promoted from the Essex and Suffolk Border League
Norwich United reserves
Spixworth, promoted from the Anglian Combination, with a name change to Norwich CBS
Swaffham Town, relegated from Premier Division

League table

Stadia and locations

References

External links
 Eastern Counties Football League

Eastern Counties Football League seasons
9